The 1984 RAC Trimoco British Saloon Car Championship was the 27th season of the championship. The title was won by Andy Rouse in a Rover Vitesse, claiming his third BSCC title.

Teams & Drivers